Trochomeria is a genus of flowering plants belonging to the family Cucurbitaceae.

Its native range is Tropical and Southern Africa.

Species:

Trochomeria baumiana 
Trochomeria debilis 
Trochomeria hookeri 
Trochomeria macrocarpa 
Trochomeria nigrescens 
Trochomeria polymorpha 
Trochomeria sagittata 
Trochomeria stefaninii 
Trochomeria subglabra

References

Cucurbitoideae
Cucurbitaceae genera